Mian Mahalleh-ye Pap Kiadeh (also Romanized as Mīān Maḩalleh-ye Pāp Kīādeh; also known as Mīyānmaḩalleh-ye Pāpīyādeh) is a village in Chaf Rural District, in the Central District of Langarud County, Gilan Province, Iran. At the 2006 census, its population was 561, in 163 families.

References 

Populated places in Langarud County